Carmacks-Kluane was a territorial electoral district in the Canadian territory of Yukon, which was represented on the Yukon Territorial Council from 1952 to 1974.

Representatives

References

Former Yukon territorial electoral districts